James Lopez Watson (May 21, 1922 – September 1, 2001) was a judge of the United States Court of International Trade. While serving as a judge around the country, Watson became the first African-American to head a federal court in the American Deep South.

Education and career

Born on May 21, 1922, in Harlem, New York City, New York, the son of James S. Watson and Violet Watson, James L. Watson served in the United States Army from 1943 to 1945, where he fought in Italy and received the Purple Heart. He received a Bachelor of Arts degree in 1947 from New York University and a Bachelor of Laws in 1951 from Brooklyn Law School. He was engaged in private practice from 1951 to 1953. He was a member of the New York State Senate from 1954 to 1963. He was a Judge of the New York City Civil Court from 1963 to 1966.

New York State Senate service

Watson was a member of the New York State Senate (21st D.) from 1955 to 1963, sitting in the 170th, 171st, 172nd, 173rd, and 174th New York State Legislatures.

Federal judicial service

Watson was nominated by President Lyndon B. Johnson on January 19, 1966, to a seat on the United States Customs Court vacated by Judge Jed Johnson. He was confirmed by the United States Senate on March 4, 1966, and received his commission on March 7, 1966. He was reassigned by operation of law to the United States Court of International Trade on November 1, 1980, to a new seat authorized by 94 Stat. 1727. Because judges of that court are periodically assigned to federal courts around the country, Watson became the first African-American judge to head a federal court in the American Deep South. He assumed senior status on February 28, 1991. His service terminated on September 1, 2001, due to his death of cancer in Harlem.

Honor

In 2003, the courthouse at 1 Federal Plaza in Manhattan was renamed the James L. Watson United States Court of International Trade Building in Watson's honor.

See also 
 List of African-American federal judges
 List of African-American jurists
 List of first minority male lawyers and judges in the United States

References

Sources
 

1922 births
2001 deaths
United States Army personnel of World War II
United States Army soldiers
New York University alumni
Brooklyn Law School alumni
African-American state legislators in New York (state)
New York (state) state court judges
Democratic Party New York (state) state senators
Deaths from cancer in New York (state)
African-American judges
People from Harlem
Judges of the United States Customs Court
Judges of the United States Court of International Trade
United States federal judges appointed by Lyndon B. Johnson
20th-century American judges